Adair County is a county located in the U.S. state of Kentucky. As of the 2020 census, the population was 18,903.  Its county seat is Columbia. The county was founded in 1801 and named for John Adair, then Speaker of the House in Kentucky and later Governor of Kentucky (1820 – 1824). Adair County has some of the few surviving American Chestnut trees in the United States.

History
Adair County was formed on December 11, 1801, from sections of Green County. Columbia was chosen as the county seat the following year and the first courthouse was built in 1806.

The county was named in honor of John Adair, a veteran of the Revolutionary War and Northwest Indian War. Later he commanded Kentucky troops in the Battle of New Orleans. He served as the eighth Governor of Kentucky. This was the 44th of Kentucky's 120 counties to be organized.

After the American Civil War, a gang of five men, believed to include Frank and Jesse James from Missouri, robbed the Bank of Columbia of $600 on April 29, 1872. They killed the cashier, R.A.C. Martin, in the course of the robbery.

The courthouse on the Columbia town square, completed in 1884, replaced the original 1806 courthouse.

Geography
It is part of the Pennyroyal Plateau region of Kentucky and is part of western Appalachia. Over 40% of the county's land is covered with timber.

The Green River is the county's major waterway but is not commercially navigable. The river was impounded to form Green River Lake, the major feature of Green River Lake State Park, which lies in Adair and Taylor counties.

Adjacent counties
 Taylor County – north (EST)
 Casey County – northeast (EST)
 Russell County – east
 Cumberland County – south
 Metcalfe County – southwest
 Green County – northwest

Demographics

As of the census of 2000, there were 17,244 people, 6,747 households, and 4,803 families residing in the county. The racial makeup of the county was 96.00% White, 2.55% Black or African American, 0.22% Native American, 0.26% Asian, 0.02% Pacific Islander, 0.19% from other races, and 0.76% from two or more races. 0.77% of the population were Hispanic or Latino of any race.

There were 6,747 households, out of which 31.50% had children under the age of 18 living with them, 57.60% were married couples living together, 10.20% had a female householder with no husband present, and 28.80% were non-families. 26.20% of all households were made up of individuals, and 13.00% had someone living alone who was 65 years of age or older. The average household size was 2.44 and the average family size was 2.93.

In the county, the population was spread out, with 23.50% under the age of 18, 10.70% from 18 to 24, 27.70% from 25 to 44, 23.40% from 45 to 64, and 14.60% who were 65 years of age or older. The median age was 37 years. For every 100 females there were 94.00 males. For every 100 females age 18 and over, there were 91.60 males.

The median income for a household in the county was $24,055, and the median income for a family was $29,779. Males had a median income of $23,183 versus $17,009 for females. The per capita income for the county was $14,931. About 18.20% of families and 24.00% of the population were below the poverty line, including 29.60% of those under age 18 and 21.70% of those age 65 or over.

Economy
Adair County's agrarian economy produces livestock, dairy products, corn, and tobacco. The county experienced a minor oil boom in the 1960s.

Lack of adequate transportation infrastructure hindered the county's prosperity well into the 20th century. The completion of the east-west Cumberland Parkway in 1973 significantly ameliorated this problem, but since then the county has sought improved road access to the north.

Education
The county is served by Adair County Schools.

Its schools are:
 Adair County Primary Center (Principal: Patty R. Jones; Asst. Principal: Laura H. Murrell)
 Adair County Elementary School (Principal: Steve Burton; Assistant Principal: Sommer Brown)
 Adair County Middle School (Principal: Alma Rich; Assistant Principal: Donna Young)
 Adair County High School (Principal: Troy Young; Assistant Principal: Doug Holmes).

Politics

Voter registration

Statewide elections

Communities

City
 Columbia

Unincorporated communities
Below is partial listing of known unincorporated communities within Adair County. A more complete listing is available here.
 Breeding
 Crocus (partially in Russell County)
 Glens Fork
 Gradyville
 Knifley
 Neatsville
 Pellyton
 Sparksville
 Cane Valley
 Coburg
 Holmes Bend
 Kellyville

Notable residents
 Thomas E. Bramlette, Governor of Kentucky
 Robert Porter Caldwell (1821–1885), United States Congressman, was born in Adair County.
 E. A. Diddle, men's basketball coach for Western Kentucky University
 Janice Holt Giles (1909–1979), a writer noted particularly for her regional novels and nonfiction, lived in Adair County from 1949 until her death in 1979.
 James R. Hindman, Lieutenant Governor of Kentucky
 Sergeant Dakota Meyer (b. 1988), born and initially educated in Adair County, received the Medal of Honor in 2011 for his actions in Operation Enduring Freedom in Afghanistan in 2009
 Pinkney H. Walker, Chief Justice of the Illinois Supreme Court, was born in Adair County.
 Evelyn West, burlesque actress
 Frank Lane Wolford, U.S. Representative from Kentucky

See also

 National Register of Historic Places listings in Adair County, Kentucky
List of counties in Kentucky

References

Bibliography

Further reading

External links
 Columbia & Adair Chamber of Commerce
 Columbia Magazine
 Burtons of Adair County

 
1801 establishments in Kentucky
Kentucky counties
Populated places established in 1801
Counties of Appalachia